Polystoechotes is a genus of giant lacewings in the family Ithonidae. There are at least two described species in Polystoechotes, which are native to North America. The name is derived from the Greek πολύς (polys) meaning  "much" and στοιχάς (stoichas) meaning "in rows behind another".

Species
These two species belong to the genus Polystoechotes:
 Polystoechotes gazullai 
 Polystoechotes punctata (Fabricius, 1793) b

References

Further reading

 

Ithonidae
Articles created by Qbugbot